The Pennsylvania Code is a publication of the Commonwealth of Pennsylvania, listing all rules, regulations, and other administrative documents from the Government of Pennsylvania.

Citation

Title 1 section 1.2 of the Pennsylvania Code suggests citation in the following format
 The number of the title
 The abbreviation "Pa. Code"
 The section of the Code

(e.g., 1 Pa. Code § 1.2)

See also
 Pennsylvania Bulletin, a weekly publication of changes to agency rules and regulations
 Law of Pennsylvania

References

External links
 Pennsylvania Code from pacode.com (Note: Omits some titles, e.g. Title 18)

Government of Pennsylvania
Pennsylvania
Pennsylvania law